The Northern Inspectorate of Greenland also known as North Greenland was a Danish inspectorate on Greenland consisting of the trading centers and missionary stations along the northwest coast of the island.

History
North Greenland was established in 1721. Its capital was at Godhavn (modern Qeqertarsuaq). The southernmost town of North Greenland was Egedesminde, which bordered Holsteinborg, which was the northernmost town of South Greenland. This boundary between North and South Greenland ran at around 68°N latitude, and in the North, North Greenland stretched to 78°N to enclose Thule.

In 1911, as the administration of the colony was removed from the Royal Greenland Trading Department and folded into the Danish Ministry of the Interior, a provincial council was established. It was elected indirectly from the local councils and had little say in the management of the colony.

North Greenland was united with South Greenland in 1950, with the administration for the northern settlements moved to Godthaab (modern Nuuk).

See also
 List of inspectors of North Greenland, for the chief officers of the colony between 1782 and 1924
 List of governors of North Greenland, for the chief officers of the colony between 1924 and 1950
 Avannaa County, Greenland, a former administrative division of Greenland also known as "North Greenland" in English
  South Greenland

References

States and territories disestablished in 1950
Former populated places in Greenland
Former Danish colonies
1950 disestablishments in North America
20th-century disestablishments in Greenland